Highlow is a civil parish in the Derbyshire Dales district of Derbyshire, England.  The parish contains nine listed buildings that are recorded in the National Heritage List for England.  Of these, two are listed at Grade II*, the middle of the three grades, and the others are at Grade II, the lowest grade.  The most important buildings in the parish are Highlow Hall and its gateway, which are listed at Grade II*.  All the other listed buildings, apart from a bridge, are buildings or structures associated with the hall.


Key

Buildings

References

Citations

Sources

 

Lists of listed buildings in Derbyshire